Peter Gelle (born 23 August 1984) is a Slovak sprint canoer who has competed since the late 2000s. He is a member of the Hungarian community in Slovakia.

He won a silver medal in the K-1 500 m at the 2010 ICF Canoe Sprint World Championships in Poznań and a gold medal in the K-2 1000 m in 2011 with Erik Vlček.

Biography
Peter was born in Štúrovo and is a member of ethnic Hungarian community in Slovakia. The area was transferred to a newly formed Czechoslovakia following the Treaty of Trianon.

References

External links
 
 
 
 

1984 births
Living people
Slovak male canoeists
Canoeists at the 2012 Summer Olympics
Canoeists at the 2016 Summer Olympics
Olympic canoeists of Slovakia
Hungarians in Slovakia
ICF Canoe Sprint World Championships medalists in kayak
Canoeists at the 2015 European Games
European Games competitors for Slovakia
Canoeists at the 2019 European Games
Canoeists at the 2020 Summer Olympics